The Western Regional Command (known until 1923 as 2nd General Command) was the overall command of all Royal Danish Army units in Jutland and on Funen. It was split into four military regions, and was responsible for the regional defence. In 1990, the Regional Commands were disbanded and control was collected at the newly created Army Operational Command.

History
Originally named the General Command Northern Jutland, it was one of five General Commands. In 1855, it absorbed the General Command of Funen and was renamed the 2nd General Command. In 1923, the 2nd General Command was disbanded. Overall command was given to the Jutland Division in 1932.

In 1950, as part of expansive rebuilding and reorganization of the army, the General Command was revived as the Western Regional Command. In the beginning there was large focus on having a larger defence in Jutland and the 2nd General Command. However, after the West German rearmament, focus was sifted to the Eastern Regional Command. In case of war, the command would be placed under the control of the Allied Forces Northern Europe.
Following the end of the Cold War, there was a political wish to reduce military spending along with greater centralization. This led to the Western Regional Command being disbanded in 1990 and control given to the newly created Army Operational Command.

Structure

2nd General Command
Structure in 1870 was:
Jutland
 6th Battalion in Viborg
 8th Battalion in Viborg
 9th Battalion in Aalborg
 10th Battalion in Fredericia
 11th Battalion in Aalborg
 12th Battalion in Fredericia
 14th Battalion in Århus
 20th Battalion in Århus
 27th Reserve Battalion in Fredericia
 28th Reserve Battalion in Århus
 29th Reserve Battalion in Viborg
 30th Reserve Battalion in Aalobrg
 3rd Dragoon Regiment in Århus
 5th Dragoon Regiment in Randers

Funen
 5th Battalion in Odense
 7th Battalion in Nyborg
 16th Battalion in Odense
 19th Battalion in Nyborg
 25th Reserve Battalion in Nyborg
 26th Reserve Battalion in Odense
 2nd Dragoon Regiment in Odense

Western Regional Command
The structure in 1950–1990 was:
  Jutland Division in Åbenrå 
  1st Jutland Brigade in Fredericia 
  2nd Jutland Brigade in Aalborg 
  3rd Jutland Brigade in Fredericia 
  Jutland battle group 
 Military Region I, II, III & IV
  Schleswig Regiment of Foot in Haderslev
  Prince's Life Regiment in Viborg
  Funen Life Regiment in Odense
  Jutlandic Regiment of Foot in Fredericia 
  King's Jutlandic Regiment of Foot in Fredericia
  Queen's Life Regiment in Aalborg
  Field Lord's regiment of foot in Aalborg 
  Jutland Dragoon Regiment in Holsterbro
  North Jutland Artillery Regiment in Århus
  Southern Jutland Artillery Regiment in Varde
  Jutlandic Air Defence Regiment in Tønder
  Jutlandic Logistic Regiment in Aalborg
  Jutlandic Engineer Regiment in Randers
  Jutlandic Signal Regiment in Århus

Commanders
General Command Northern Jutland

General Command Northern Jutland, Funen and Langeland

2nd General command

Vestre Landsdelskommando

Names

Notes

References

Bibliography
 
 
 
 
 
 
 
 
 
 
 
 
 
 
 
 
 
 
 
 
 

Army units and formations of Denmark